The Sidewalks of New York (1925 and 1929) are two cartoon short films made by animation pioneers Max Fleischer and Dave Fleischer, both films using the 1894 song "The Sidewalks of New York".

Both films feature the "Follow the Bouncing Ball" gimmick, and are also known under the title "East Side, West Side", the informal title of the original song. The Fleischer brothers, Lee DeForest, Hugo Riesenfeld, and Edwin Miles Fadiman formed Red Seal Pictures to release the Song Car-Tunes series, which started in May 1924 with the release of Oh Mabel.

The first film, released in May 1925, was made for the Song Car-Tunes series and was filmed in the DeForest Phonofilm sound-on-film process. The Song Car-Tunes series eventually totaled 36 films, of which 19 were made in sound using Phonofilm.

The film was remade in 1929 and was released on February 5 by Paramount Famous Lasky Corporation through the Fleischer brothers' new studio Fleischer Studios with a new soundtrack recorded in RCA Photophone. The second film was the first entry in the Fleischers' new series Screen Songs and the first by Fleischer Studios overall.

References

External links
The Sidewalks of New York (1925) at IMDB
1925 film at SilentEra
The Sidewalks of New York (1929) at IMDB
1929 film at SilentEra

1925 short films
Short films directed by Dave Fleischer
American black-and-white films
Phonofilm short films
Fleischer Studios short films
1925 animated films
1929 short films
1929 animated films
Paramount Pictures short films
Sing-along
1920s English-language films
American animated short films